Phyllota squarrosa, commonly known as the dense phyllota, is a species of flowering plant in the pea family (Fabaceae) from eastern Australia. It was given its current name by George Bentham in 1837.

References

Mirbelioids
Fabales of Australia
Flora of New South Wales
Plants described in 1837